Jason Lubell Itzler (born February 23, 1967) is an American entrepreneur, attorney, and the founder of escort company, New York Confidential LLC.

Early life
Jason Lubell Itzler was born Jason Lubell Sylk the only son of Ronnie Lubell and Leonard Allen Sylk. Following his parents’ divorce, Itzler moved to New York with his mother. Jason was influenced growing up by his grandfather, Nathan Lubell, who was a founding partner in the Riviera in Las Vegas. He also owned an amusement park in Coney Island for his four young daughters to enjoy. Jason's mother eventually remarried Ron Itzler, a then prominent lawyer in the firm of Fischbein, Badillo, Wagner, and Itzler, and so the family moved to the suburbs of New Jersey. Growing up, Jason attended a number of private schools, including the Elisabeth Morrow School, the Dwight-Englewood School, the Hotchkiss School, and Tenafly High School. Jason spent many of his evenings at the New York Friars Club, and summers in the Catskills, where he worked as a cabana boy at the Concord Hotel. Jason graduated from The George Washington University with degrees in political science and art history. He was also a member of the fraternity, Zeta Beta Tau.

Itzler enrolled in the Shepard Broad College of Law in the late 1980s and graduated with a J.D. in 1993. While there he started a phone sex operation called M2 Communications, Inc., where he would charge $4.98-a-minute, and soon become a young millionaire. The company averaged $1,500,000 a month. Due to his mother's untimely death from cancer in 1994, he abandoned his business and was eventually forced to declare bankruptcy in 1997. His next company was called SoHo Models. Itzler rented an 8,000-square-foot loft on the corner of Canal and Broadway in New York City to be one of the first companies to supply Webcam porn.

New York Confidential
In 2001, Itzler was arrested at Newark Liberty International Airport for trying to smuggle ecstasy into the United States. After serving seven months in jail for the drug charge, he was released on parole in 2003, after which he started an escort service named New York Confidential. To meet the condition of his parole that he maintain legitimate employment, Itzler was fraudulently listed as a paralegal in the office of his attorney, Paul Bergrin.

New York Confidential was run out of Itzler's Art Deco apartment in Hoboken. The company was doing well and the office was moved to a 5000 sq ft. loft at 79 Worth Street in Manhattan. In 2004 Itzler was averaging a gross of $55,000 a night. "That's because we were the best," said Itzler. "At NY Confidential, I told my girls that the pressure is on them because we have to provide the clients with the greatest single experience ever, a Kodak moment to treasure for the rest of their lives. Spreading happiness, positive energy, and love,that's what being the best means to me. Call me a dreamer, but that's the NY Confidential credo." It was this attention to detail and customer satisfaction that made the group successful, attracting a wide array of clients, including senators and famous athletes. There were even talks of franchising Confidentials in other cities, such as Las Vegas.

In 2005, authorities arrested Itzler, who pleaded guilty to money laundering and promoting prostitution in 2006, and was sentenced to 18 months in prison.

On May 14, 2012, Itzler was sentenced to four years in prison for prostitution, money laundering, and drug charges after an investigation the previous summer found evidence that he had sold cocaine and provided a prostitute to a Manhattan customer.

Personal life
Itzler is Jewish and has been engaged 7 times. He has dated his own girls including the number one escort Natalie McLennan, known as Natalia. Natalia made as much as $2,000 per hour with a two-hour minimum working as an escort at New York Confidential. Asked if the work affected her relationship with Itzler, Natalia says he would sometimes get jealous of the time she spent away from him, but not of the men. It would only bother him if she slept with another man for free. In 2010, Natalia pleaded guilty to a charge of attempted money laundering in connection to New York Confidential. Itzler has Hanuman and "Super Lucky" tattooed on his arms since the early 1990s.

Media Attention 
Itzler has been featured on The View,  He appeared several times on The Opie & Anthony show, including phoning in from prison. He also appeared as a guest twice on The Howard Stern Show.

References 

1967 births
Living people
Jewish American attorneys
Columbian College of Arts and Sciences alumni
Dwight-Englewood School alumni
Tenafly High School alumni
People from New Jersey
American company founders